The North Jackson Street Bridge is a historic bridge in De Witt, Arkansas. Built c. 1910, it carries North Jackson Street over Holt Branch, just south of North Circle Drive. It consists of two spans of steel girders, resting on concrete abutments and a concrete central pier, with concrete decking. Its guard rails consist of poured concrete panels, with incised rectangles on the side. The short spans of the bridge demonstrate the unfamiliarity with the use of concrete as a bridge-building material. North Jackson Street was originally laid out as the principal route out of De Witt heading north.

The bridge was listed on the National Register of Historic Places in 2011.

See also
North Washington Street Bridge
Maxwell Street Bridge
National Register of Historic Places listings in Arkansas County, Arkansas
List of bridges on the National Register of Historic Places in Arkansas

References

Road bridges on the National Register of Historic Places in Arkansas
Bridges completed in 1910
National Register of Historic Places in Arkansas County, Arkansas
Steel bridges in the United States
Girder bridges in the United States
1910 establishments in Arkansas
Transportation in Arkansas County, Arkansas
DeWitt, Arkansas